Ráth Tó is the Irish-language name for two places in Ireland:

 Rathtoe, County Carlow, a village
 Ratoath, County Meath, a commuter town